Dormabin is a farming community in the Krachi East Municipal in the Oti Region of Ghana. It was formerly in the Volta Region.

Institution 

 Dormabin Municipal Assembly Primary School

References 

Oti Region
Communities in Ghana